Feng Guozhang, (courtesy: Huafu 華甫 or 華符) (January 7, 1859 – December 12, 1919) was a Chinese general and politician in early republican China. He held the office of Vice-President and then President of the Republic of China. He is considered the founder of the Zhili Clique of Warlords that vied for control of northern China during the Warlord era.

Early life
Feng Guozhang was born to a real estate family in Hejian, Hebei (Zhili). His family had fallen on hard times and was forced to sell its properties to educate its sons; however being the fourth son, Feng was unable to complete his education due to costs. He reputedly had to survive part of his early life by playing the violin in theatres.

Early career

Without much recourse, Feng enlisted in the army, then undergoing reforms that would eventually create the Beiyang Army under the command of Yuan Shikai. Feng performed admirably and came to the notice of a battalion commander, who referred him to the Baoding Military Academy. It was at Baoding where he would make key friends and allies who would serve him well later on. In 1895 Feng was sent to Tokyo to serve as a military attaché and came to the attention of Yuan Shikai, who began to groom him to be one of his supporters within the Beiyang Army. However, when Yuan was forced to retire in 1908 by Manchu nobles fearful of his growing power, Feng managed to maintain a good relationship with both sides.

In October 1911, after the outbreak of the Wuchang Uprising, he was ordered by the Qing Court to suppress the revolution in Wuhan. He held back the Beiyang Army until Yuan Shikai was restored to power and then proceeded to capture Hankou and Hanyang from the revolutionaries in the Battle of Yangxia. On October 14 he was appointed to command the Second Army (consisting of two divisions) by the imperial court. In the battle he ordered the razing of Hankou. Then, following orders from Yuan Shikai, he halted the Qing military's advance on Wuchang. Yuan then negotiated the abdication of the Last Emperor and became the provisional president of the newly founded Republic of China in 1912.  Feng followed Yuan into the new government and was honored for his contribution to the Xinhai Revolution, even though he actually took an active part in suppressing it.

Politics
Feng broke with Yuan Shikai when he later attempted to make himself emperor.  Yuan Shikai made Feng a duke, but Feng declined. Yuan then sent an admiral to assassinate Feng but the admiral was himself murdered. Feng then moved to Nanjing, where he joined the National Protection War. His name was prominently missing from the list of proposed successors in Yuan's will.

Feng then served as vice president under Li Yuanhong. During the occupation of Beijing by Zhang Xun, Feng served as acting president, a position he kept when Li formally resigned.

He was sworn in as president of the Republic of China on August 1, 1917, but his constitutionality was challenged as the National Assembly was not reconvened to recognize it.

On August 14 China entered World War I on the side of the Allies after growing evidence of the German Empire's support for Zhang's coup was uncovered, as well as intense lobbying by Premier Duan Qirui. He sent about 135,000 men in labor battalions to the Western Front, Mesopotamia and German East Africa. Troops were sent into Russia to assist the Allied intervention in Russia's civil war. Sun Yat-sen set up a rival government in Guangzhou during September 1917 and also declared war later that month in a failed attempt to get international recognition. Feng wanted to peacefully resolve the north-south conflict, which led to Duan resigning in protest. Due to pressure from the Anhui clique, he brought Duan back into the premiership. Feng finished the five-year term started by Yuan in 1913 on October 10, 1918, and died in Beijing of illness.

He was given a state funeral and buried in his native Hejian county of Cangzhou, Hebei. Half a century later his tomb was desecrated during the Cultural Revolution.

Descendants
馮高鳴; Edward Feng: Traditional Chinese Medicine Licensure Trainer; Feng Chi-Shan's first son, and Feng Guozhang's grandson.
馮道復;  Peter Feng: politics professor; Edward Feng's son, Feng Chi-Shan's first grandson; and Feng Guozhang's great grandson.
馮道行;  Dao-Shing Feng: IT engineer; Edward Feng's son, Feng Chi-Shan's grandson; and Feng Guozhang's great grandson.
馮道芬; Karena Apple Feng: political consultant; Edward Feng's daughter, Feng Chi-Shan's first granddaughter; and Feng Guozhang's great granddaughter.

Relatives
馮起山; Chi-Shan Feng: Shanghai-British commissioner of police, chief inspector, Feng Guozhang's son-in-law.

See also
List of Warlords
Warlord Era
Zhili Clique
History of the Republic of China

References

Sources 

 

Presidents of the Republic of China
1859 births
1919 deaths
Politicians from Cangzhou
Vice presidents of the Republic of China
Republic of China warlords from Hebei
People of the 1911 Revolution
Progressive Party (China) politicians
Members of the Zhili clique
20th-century Chinese heads of government
Empire of China (1915–1916)
Qing dynasty generals